Edward Aloysius Fitzgerald (February 13, 1893 – March 30, 1972) was an American bishop of the Catholic Church. He served as an auxiliary bishop in the Archdiocese of Dubuque from 1946 to 1949, and as the fourth Bishop of Winona from 1949 to 1969.

Biography

Early life and ministry
Edward Fitzgerald was born in Cresco, Iowa, to Edward and Emma (née Daly) Fitzgerald. He was educated at Assumption High School in Cresco before he graduated from St. Joseph College in Dubuque in 1913. Fitgerald studied for the priesthood at the Grand Seminary of Montreal in Canada where he earned Bachelor of Sacred Theology and a Bachelor of Canon Law. He was ordained a priest for the Archdiocese of Dubuque by Archbishop James Keane on July 25, 1916. He took post-graduate studies at the University of Chicago and the University of Minnesota.

Fitzgerald served on the faculty of Loras College for 25 years where he also served as the registrar and Dean of Studies. In 1938 he received an honorary degree from Loyola University Chicago in recognition for his work in organizing Catholic colleges. During his time at Loras, Fitgerald filled a number of chaplaincies in the Dubuque area. He became a pastor at Sacred Heart in Osage in 1941 and at St. Joseph in Elkader in 1946.

Auxiliary Bishop of Dubuque
On August 3, 1946, Pope Pius XII appointed Fitzgerald Titular Bishop of Cantanus and Auxiliary Bishop of Dubuque. He was consecrated on September 12, 1946, by Archbishop Henry Rohlman in St. Raphael's Cathedral. Bishop Louis Kucera of Lincoln and Coadjutor Bishop Leo Binz of Winona served as the co-consecrators. The sermon was delivered by Archbishop Edward Howard of Portland in Oregon, who was himself a native of Cresco. Fitzgerald was the first auxiliary bishop of the Dubuque archdiocese.

Bishop of Winona
On October 20, 1949, Pope Pius XII appointed Fitzgerald bishop of the Winona diocese. He became known as "the building bishop" for his oversight of the construction of the Cathedral of the Sacred Heart, a seminary, and several churches in the diocese. He attended all four sessions of the Second Vatican Council between 1962 and 1965, and subsequently implemented the Council's reforms in the diocese, including introducing English into the Mass.

Later life and death
Fizgerald retired on January 8, 1969. He was succeeded by Bishop Loras Watters, another auxiliary bishop from Dubuque. On March 30, 1972, Fitzgerald died in the Cathedral of the Sacred Heart during the Holy Thursday liturgy. He was buried in St. Mary's Cemetery in Winona.

References

1893 births
1972 deaths
Loras College alumni
People from Cresco, Iowa
Participants in the Second Vatican Council
Roman Catholic Archdiocese of Dubuque
Roman Catholic bishops of Winona
Religious leaders from Iowa
Catholics from Iowa
20th-century Roman Catholic bishops in the United States
Loras College faculty